Ramarajan (born 18 October, 1960) is an Indian actor, writer, director and politician who specialised in acting and directing films on village-based subjects. He is also known as Makkal Nayagan in Tamil cinema.

Career
Ramarajan started his career by doing small roles beginning in the year 1977. He turned director with Mannukketha Ponnu (1985), Ramarajan instead approached Gangai Amaran to compose music. He got his first hype as a lead in the film Namma Ooru Nalla Ooru, released in 1986. He is popular for doing films on the village-based subjects; these films became the notable identity of Ramarajan. He was known for his dark shirts and colorful costumes.  His film Karagattakaran (1989) was a blockbuster hit. It ran for over 100 days in 25 centers, one year in seven-eight centres and clocked 400 days in four theatres. This was Ramarajan’s 18th film as hero, and his third collaboration with Gangai Amaran after two hits in Enga Ooru Pattukaran (1987) and Shenbagamae Shenbagamae (1988). He is also known for his performances in Enga Ooru Kavalkaran (1988) and Paattukku Naan Adimai (1990). His films were as popular as compared to the then stars Rajinikanth and Kamal Haasan.  

After 2000, his career started facing the down side. His low budget film Medhai was released in 2012 and was a failure at the box office. He has returned to acting after a gap of almost 13 years playing one of the three leads in a film titled Saamaniyan. Ramarajan has played the solo hero continuously for 45 films.

Political career
He was elected to 12th Lok Sabha as an All India Anna Dravida Munnetra Kazhagam candidate from Thiruchendur Lok Sabha constituency in 1998.

Personal life

Ramarajan fell in love with actress Nalini and they married in 1987. However, after 13 years they divorced in 2000, citing differences in their relationship. They have twin children; daughter Aruna, and, son Arun, born in 1988.

Filmography

As actor

As director

See also 
Nalini
Ramarajan (TV series)

References

External links
 

Tamil male actors
Tamil Nadu politicians
Living people
People from Sivaganga district
India MPs 1998–1999
Lok Sabha members from Tamil Nadu
1960 births
All India Anna Dravida Munnetra Kazhagam politicians
People from Thoothukudi district